Cyanidiophyceae is a class of unicellular red algae within subdivision Cyanidiophytina, and contain a single plastid, one to three mitochondria, a nucleus, a vacuole and floridean starch. Most are extremophiles inhabiting acid hot springs. The main photosynthetic pigment is C-phycocyanin. Reproduction is asexual by binary fission or formation of endospores.

References

External links
 http://www.shigen.nig.ac.jp/algae_tree/CyanidiophyceaeE.html

 
Red algae taxa